Ackley may refer to:

 Ackley (surname)
 Ackley, Iowa
 Ackley, Wisconsin
 Ackley Bridge, a British drama television series